Fyndiq is a Swedish e-commerce company founded by Dinesh Nayar in 2010 with the basic idea of being an online channel for Swedish traders to get rid of their residual stocks. Approximately 1,400 stores sell their goods, in categories such as beauty, mobile accessories, toys, electronics.

Fyndiq was founded by Dinesh Nayar, Fredrik Norberg, Micael Widell, David Brudö and Dan Nilsson.

Since the start in 2010, the company has taken in around 40 million in venture capital and the investors include Jan Carlzon.

Timeline 

 2010 - 300 products on the site from 40 different stores
 2011 - Fyndiq had a turnover of SEK 8.3 million
 2012 - Fyndiq had a turnover of SEK 56 million
 2013 - Fyndiq had a turnover of SEK 123 million, 100,000 products
 2014 - 170,000 products
 2015 - Over 400,000 products
 2016 - Over 800,000 products

References 

Online retailers of Sweden
Retail companies established in 2010
Swedish companies established in 2010